Benjamin A. Foster (born October 29, 1980) is an American actor. He has had roles in films including The Punisher (2004), X-Men: The Last Stand and Alpha Dog (both 2006), The Messenger and Pandorum (both 2009), The Mechanic (2011), Contraband (2012), Kill Your Darlings and Lone Survivor (both 2013), The Program (2015), and Leave No Trace (2018). He was nominated for a Saturn Award and a Satellite Award for his role in 3:10 to Yuma (2007) and won an Independent Spirit Award for portraying Tanner Howard in Hell or High Water (2016). He also acted as Russell Corwin in Six Feet Under (2003–2005). He had a recurring role portraying a high school student named Eli on the Judd Apatow show, Freaks and Geeks (2000), which ran for one season.

Early life
Benjamin A. Foster was born in Boston on October 29, 1980, the son of restaurant owners Steven Foster and Gillian Kirwan. He has described his parents as "free-spirited, Vietnam-protesting hippies". He has a younger brother, Jon, who is also an actor. Foster and his family relocated to Fairfield, Iowa when their Boston home was broken into by robbers while they were present.

Foster was raised Jewish, and had a Bar Mitzvah ceremony. His paternal grandparents were Celia (Segal) and Abraham Foster, who was a prominent judge and politician in Boston; their families emigrated from the Russian Empire. As a youth he attended Interlochen Arts Camp and studied theatre there.

Career

Foster began working as an actor when he was 16 years old.  In 1996 and 1997, he starred in the Disney Channel television series Flash Forward.

In 2001, he acted in the film Get Over It. Foster also had a recurring role as Russell Corwin (22 episodes) in the HBO original series, Six Feet Under. After appearing in the films 11:14 and The Punisher, Foster appeared in Hostage with Bruce Willis, Kevin Pollak, and Michelle Horn. In 2006, Foster appeared in X-Men: The Last Stand as the comic-book hero Angel / Warren Worthington III. In the crime thriller Alpha Dog, he played the character Jake Mazursky and added glaucoma drops to his eyes to simulate the appearance of a drug addict in the film. In 2007, he played cold-blooded killer and outlaw Charlie Prince in the Western film 3:10 to Yuma. In February 2013, he was cast to replace Shia LaBeouf in the Broadway play Orphans as his first theater performance. In May 2014, it was announced that he would star opposite Gillian Anderson and Vanessa Kirby in Benedict Andrews' new production of A Streetcar Named Desire at the Young Vic in London. The same production closed on September 19, 2014 and transferred to New York in 2016, opening at St. Ann's Warehouse in Brooklyn.

Foster played Lance Armstrong in the biopic The Program, and co-starred in the fantasy adventure Warcraft, released in June 2016.

Also in 2016, Foster appeared in Hell or High Water as the dangerous Tanner Howard, opposite Chris Pine and Jeff Bridges. Foster was acclaimed for his roles and has received numerous awards nominations.

Foster has often received praise from critics for his "intense" and "unhinged" performances in numerous films. Film critic Matt Zoller Seitz described Foster in 2016 as "one of those actors who makes even a bad film worth seeing. Sometimes he suggests the film you'd rather be watching."

Personal life
Foster was in a relationship with German actress Antje Traue, his co-star in the movie Pandorum. Traue revealed in an interview that she had moved to Los Angeles and lived with Foster until their relationship ended around 2010. Foster began a relationship with actress Robin Wright in early 2012. They became engaged in early 2014, but called off their engagement on November 12, 2014. Foster and Wright reconciled in early 2015; however, on August 29, 2015, they announced they were ending their second engagement.

In October 2016, Foster announced his engagement to actress Laura Prepon. Prepon gave birth to their first child, a daughter, Ella, in August 2017. Foster and Prepon married in June 2018. Their son was born in February 2020.

After filming of the movie Here ended, five members of the cast and crew got tattooed with the letters T.I.A., which stand for This Is Armenia.

Foster practices transcendental meditation.

Filmography and stage work

Film

Television

Stage

References

External links

 

1980 births
20th-century American male actors
21st-century American male actors
American male child actors
American male film actors
American male television actors
American people of Russian-Jewish descent
American people of Scottish descent
Independent Spirit Award for Best Supporting Male winners
Jewish American male actors
Living people
Male actors from Boston
Male actors from Iowa
People from Fairfield, Iowa
21st-century American Jews